Neuburg Congregational Church near Mott, North Dakota was built in 1925.  It has Gothic Revival architecture.

It was listed on the National Register of Historic Places in 2007.  The listing includes a contributing building, a contributing site, and a contributing structure.  It includes a cemetery within its .

In 1925, early in the Great Depression, it was voted by a group of German-Russian immigrants to build a new church.

References

German-Russian culture in North Dakota
Churches on the National Register of Historic Places in North Dakota
Carpenter Gothic church buildings in North Dakota
Churches completed in 1925
National Register of Historic Places in Hettinger County, North Dakota
1925 establishments in North Dakota
Gothic Revival church buildings in North Dakota